Catriona is a genus of sea slugs, aeolid nudibranchs, marine gastropod molluscs in the family Trinchesiidae. All species were transferred to Tenellia as a result of a DNA phylogeny study in 2016. It was reinstated in 2017 on the basis of DNA and morphological criteria.

Species within the genus Catriona include:
 Catriona aurantia (Alder & Hancock, 1842) - type species of Catriona
 Catriona casha Gosliner & Griffiths, 1981
 Catriona columbiana (O'Donoghue, 1922)
 Catriona gymnota (Couthouy, 1838)
 Catriona lonca Er. Marcus, 1965
 Catriona maua Ev. Marcus & Er. Marcus, 1960
 Catriona nigricolora (Baba, 1955)
 Catriona oba Ev. Marcus, 1970
 Catriona pinnifera (Baba, 1949)
 Catriona rickettsi Behrens, 1984
 Catriona signifera Baba, 1961
 Catriona susa Ev. Marcus & Er. Marcus, 1960
 Catriona tema Edmunds, 1968
 Catriona urquisa Er. Marcus, 1965
 Catriona venusta (Baba, 1949)

Species names currently considered to be synonyms:
 Catriona anulata (Baba, 1949): synonym of Trinchesia anulata (Baba, 1949)
 Catriona catachroma Burn, 1963 synonym of Trinchesia catachroma (Burn, 1963)
 Catriona ornata (Baba, 1937): synonym of Trinchesia ornata (Baba, 1937)
 Catriona perca Marcus Er., 1958 synonym of Cuthona perca (Er. Marcus, 1958)
 Catriona puellula (Baba, 1955): synonym of Cuthona puellula (Baba, 1955)
 Catriona pupillae Baba, 1961 synonym of Trinchesia pupillae (Baba, 1961)
 Catriona viridiana Burn, 1962 synonym of Trinchesia viridiana (Burn, 1962)

References

Trinchesiidae
Gastropod genera